Hohenberg may refer to:

Places

Austria
 Hohenberg (Gemeinde Lunz), cadastral municipality of Lunz am See, Lower Austria
 Hohenberg, Lower Austria, a municipality in the district of Lilienfeld, Lower Austria
 Hohenberg (Gemeinde Aigen), village in the municipality of Aigen im Ennstal, Styria
 Hohenberg (Gemeinde Stattegg), village in the municipality of Stattegg, Styria

Germany
 Hohenberg (Aalen), a village in the borough of Aalen, Ostalbkreis, Baden-Württemberg
 Hohenberg (Bopfingen), a village in the borough of Bopfingen, Ostalbkreis, Baden-Württemberg
 Hohenberg (Durbach), a village in the municipality of Durbach, Ortenaukreis, Baden-Württemberg
 Hohenberg (Kreßberg), a village in the municipality of Kreßberg, county of Schwäbisch Hall, Baden-Württemberg
 Hohenberg (Rosenberg), a village in the municipality of Rosenberg, Ostalbkreis, Baden-Württemberg
 Hohenberg (Sulzbach-Laufen), a village in the municipality of Sulzbach-Laufen, county of Schwäbisch Hall, Baden-Württemberg
 Hohenberg (Wolpertshausen), a village in the municipality of Wolpertshausen, county of Schwäbisch Hall, Baden-Württemberg
 Hohenberg (Herrieden), a village in the borough of Herrieden, county of Ansbach, Bayern
 Hohenberg (Marktleugast), a village in the borough of Marktleugast, county of Kulmbach, Bayern
 Hohenberg (Regnitzlosau), a village in the municipality of Regnitzlosau, county of Hof, Bayern
 Hohenberg (Seeshaupt), a village in the municipality of Seeshaupt, county of Weilheim-Schongau, Bayern
 Hohenberg an der Eger, town in the county of Wunsiedel, Bayern
 Hohenberg-Krusemark, a municipality in the county of Stendal, Saxony-Anhalt
 Hohenberg (Daldorf), a village in the municipality of Daldorf, county of Segeberg, Schleswig-Holstein

People
 Hohenberg family, an Austrian ducal family
 Count of Hohenberg, an ancient Swabian dynasty
 Count of Hohenberg (Pfinzgau), a state in the Holy Roman Empire, formed in the 11th century
 German nobility:
 Gertrude of Hohenberg (1225–1281), progenitor of the Austrian House of Habsburg
 Gustav von Meyern-Hohenberg (1820–1878), German jurist and playwright
 Maximilian, Duke of Hohenberg (1902–1962)
 Sophie, Duchess of Hohenberg (1868–1914)
 Princess Sophie of Hohenberg (1901–1990)
 Prince Ernst of Hohenberg (1904–1954)
 Georg, Duke of Hohenberg (born 1929)
 Pierre Hohenberg (1934–2017), French-American theoretical physicist

Other uses
 Hohenberg Bros. Co., a cotton trading company
 Hohenberg (Wasgau), a hill in the Palatinate Forest, southwestern Germany

See also
 Hohenberg Castle (disambiguation)
 Hohenburg (disambiguation)